Events from the year 1741 in art.

Events
At the request of the new Empress Elizabeth of Russia, painter Ivan Nikitich Nikitin begins his journey back from exile in Tobolsk to Saint Petersburg but dies en route.
Charles-Joseph Natoire produces a series of cartoons for the Gobelins tapestries History of Mark Anthony.
A major collection of Old Master drawings and other material from the collection of Pierre Crozat (died 1740) is auctioned in Paris; the catalogue written by Pierre-Jean Mariette is the first modern descriptive sale catalogue.

Works

 Pietro Longhi – La lezione di danza
 Michele Marieschi – Magnificentiores Selectioresque Urbis Venetiarum Prospectus (engravings)
 Martin van Meytens – Portrait of Francis I, Grand Duke of Tuscany

Births
February 7 – Henry Fuseli, Swiss-born British painter, draughtsman, and writer on art (d. 1825)
March 1 - Johann Georg Edlinger, Austrian court painter (died 1819)
March 18 – Alexander Kucharsky, Polish portrait painter (died 1819)
March 20 – Jean-Antoine Houdon, French neoclassical sculptor (died 1828)
March 26 – Jean-Michel Moreau, French illustrator and engraver  (died 1814)
April 15 – Charles Willson Peale, American painter, soldier and naturalist (died 1827)
October 11 – James Barry, Irish painter (died 1806)
October 30 – Angelica Kauffman, Swiss-Austrian painter (died 1807)
November 18 - Carlo Antonio Porporati, Italian engraver and painter (died 1816)
date unknown
Eliphalet Chapin, American furniture designer (died 1807)
François-Anne David, French line-engraver (died 1824)
Cornelius Høyer, Danish miniature painter (died 1804)
Thomas Hickey, Irish painter of portraits and genre scenes (died 1824)
Wojciech Kucharski, Polish sculptor and mason (died 1819)
James Nixon, English miniature-painter (died 1812)
Mette Magrete Tvistman, Danish clockmaker (died 1827)
Johann Dallinger von Dalling, Austrian painter (died 1806)

Deaths
February 15 - Georg Rafael Donner, Austrian sculptor (born 1693)
February 19 – Andrea Locatelli, Italian painter of landscapes (vedute) (born 1695)
March 8 - Étienne-Jehandier Desrochers, French engraver (born 1668)
April 17 – Onofrio Avellino, Italian painter of the Baroque period (born 1674)
May 16 – Jacob Christoph Le Blon, German painter and engraver who invented the system of three- and four-colour printing (born 1667)
June 6 – Giuseppe Maria Mazza, Bolognese sculptor of the Rococo period (born 1653)
July 8 – Pietro Paltronieri, Italian painter of quadratura (born 1673)
November – Giovanni Antonio Pellegrini, Venetian decorative and mural painter (born 1675)
date unknown
Giacomo Adolfi, Italian painter of the Baroque period, active in and around Bergamo (born 1682)
Giovanni Antonio Capello, Italian painter of the late-Baroque period, active in Brescia (born 1669)
Pedro de Uceda, Spanish Baroque painter (born unknown)
Ivan Nikitich Nikitin, Russian painter of portraits and battle scenes (born 1690)
Alexey Zubov, Russian etcher (born 1682)

 
Years of the 18th century in art
1740s in art